Biyadiglign Elyas is an Ethiopian professional footballer who plays as a defender for Saint George F.C.

International career
In January 2014, coach Sewnet Bishaw, invited him to be a part of the Ethiopia squad for the 2014 African Nations Championship. The team was eliminated in the group stages after losing to Congo, Libya and Ghana.

References

Living people
Ethiopian footballers
Ethiopia A' international footballers
2014 African Nations Championship players
1988 births
Association football defenders
Ethiopia international footballers
2013 Africa Cup of Nations players